Aubigny-en-Laonnois is a commune in the department of Aisne in the Hauts-de-France region of northern France.

Geography
Aubigny-en-Laonnois is located some 18 km south-east of Laon and 35 km north-west of Rheims. It can be accessed by main highway D1044 which runs along and forms most of the western border of the commune. Access to the village is by the D907 road from Courtrizy-et-Fussigny in the north, changing to the D902 at the commune border and continuing south to the village and south again through the commune to join the D1044. The D90 also runs east from the D1044 forming part of the northern border of the commune and continuing to Saint-Erme-Outre-et-Ramecourt. The D88 also runs west from the D1044 through the south of the commune and continuing to Aizelles. The commune consists of mixed farmland and forests with no other villages or hamlets.

The Ruisseau de Fayau rises in the commune and flows south-east to join the Mielle river east of Corbeny.

Neighbouring communes and villages

Administration

List of Successive Mayors of Aubigny-en-Laonnois

Population

Economy

Agriculture
The rolling hills of Aubigny are particularly conducive to the cultivation of strawberries. Strawberries are planted in late summer: August and September. In February, they are mulched and tarpaulined to protect them from spring frosts. Harvest begins in late April or, at the latest, mid-May if it is a very cold year. Strawberries are harvested by hand and placed in 500 g or 250 g trays then sold in the markets of Laon, Saint-Quentin, Charleville-Mézières, and Epernay. In recent years, varieties have multiplied: Gariguette, Ciflorette, Mara des bois, Darselect, and finally the famous forest strawberry (in order of seasonal arrival).

Culture and heritage

Civil heritage
The Chateau Park is registered as an historical monument.

See also
Communes of the Aisne department

References

External links
Aubigny-en-Laonnois on the old IGN website 
Aubigny-en-Laonnois on Géoportail, National Geographic Institute (IGN) website 
Aubigny on the 1750 Cassini Map

Communes of Aisne